Polymerase (RNA) III (DNA directed) polypeptide G (32kD)-like also known as POLR3GL is a protein which in humans is encoded by the POLR3GL gene.

Related gene problems
TAR syndrome
1q21.1 deletion syndrome
1q21.1 duplication syndrome

References